Goose Green is a mainly residential area of Wigan, Greater Manchester, England. Historically, it forms part of Lancashire.

References

Areas of Wigan